The German torpedo boat T36 was the last of 15 Type 39 torpedo boats built for the Kriegsmarine (German Navy) during World War II. Completed in late 1944, T36 was assigned to convoy escort duties and supporting German forces in the Baltic. At the end of January 1945, she rescued survivors from the torpedoed ocean liner . The boat screened German warships as they bombarded advancing Soviet troops and escorted convoys over the next several months. In May, T36 began to ferry refugees; she struck a mine on 4 May and was sunk by Soviet aircraft the following day.

Design and description
The Type 39 torpedo boat was conceived as a general-purpose design, much larger than preceding German torpedo boats. Their crew numbered 206 officers and sailors. The Type 39s were fitted with a pair of geared steam turbine sets, each driving one shaft, using steam from four high-pressure water-tube boilers.

As built, the Type 39 ships mounted four  SK C/32 guns in single mounts protected by gun shields; one forward of the superstructure, one between the funnels, and two aft, one superfiring over the other. Anti-aircraft defense was provided by four  SK C/30 AA guns in two twin-gun mounts on platforms abaft the rear funnel, and a dozen  C/38 guns. One quadruple mount of the latter was positioned on the aft superstructure and two more were fitted on the bridge wings. They carried six above-water  torpedo tubes in two triple mounts amidships and could also carry 30 mines; the full complement of 60 mines made the ships top-heavy which could be dangerous in bad weather. For anti-submarine work the boats were fitted with a S-Gerät sonar and four depth charge launchers. The Type 39s were equipped with a FuMO 21 radar and various FumB radar detectors were installed late in the war.

Construction and career
T36 was ordered on 20 January 1941 from Schichau, laid down at their Elbing, East Prussia, shipyard on 10 June 1943 as yard number 1518, launched on 5 February 1944 and commissioned on 9 December 1944. After working up for the next several months, the boat was escorting the heavy cruiser  on the night of 30 January 1945. They were supposed to rendezvous with an evacuation convoy that included Wilhelm Gustloff transporting refugees and troops from East Prussia in the face of the advancing Red Army (Operation Hannibal), but the liner was torpedoed by the Soviet submarine S-13. After depth-charging the submarine, T36 was able to pick up 564 survivors from the disaster and landed them at Sassnitz. In early March T36 screened Admiral Scheer as they bombarded Soviet forces opposite Wollin Island. The boat screened evacuation convoys from Hela, East Prussia, to friendly territory in early April. She ferried 150 people from Hela to the West on 3 May. T36 returned to Hela and, laden with refugees, sailed for Copenhagen, Denmark, the following day. She struck a mine off Swinemünde later that day and was sunk the following day by Soviet aircraft.

Notes

Citations

References

External links
 T36 at german navy.de

Type 39 torpedo boats
1944 ships
Ships sunk by Soviet aircraft
Torpedo boats sunk by aircraft
Ships built by Schichau
Ships built in Elbing
Maritime incidents in May 1945